The 2020–21 ZhHL season was the sixth season of the Zhenskaya Hockey League (ZhHL) since the league was established in 2015. It was the 26th season in which the women's ice hockey Russian Championship was contested.

League business

Team changes 
In the first week of July 2020, Dynamo St. Petersburg unexpectedly announced that they would be withdrawing from the league immediately, due to insufficient funding. Seven Dynamo players were then signed by SK Gorny St. Petersburg, but that club soon ran into financial difficulties as well, due in large part to being dropped by their main sponsor. 

A few weeks after Dynamo's folding, the league announced the creation of a new team, МSМО 7.62 to fill the vacancy. Playing out of Podmoskovie Ice Palace in Voskresensk, Moscow Oblast, 7.62's roster was filed entirely by players 18 and under, several of whom were members of the Russian national junior team.

Ultimately, SK Gorny was unable to attract sufficient sponsor investment and folded. Facing the very real possibility of St. Petersburg having zero ZhHL teams active for the 2020–21 season, a partnership between the junior department of HC Dinamo Saint Petersburg and the SKA-Neva club was able to establish a new team at the last moment. The team, called Dinamo-Neva Saint Petersburg (also romanized as Dynamo-Neva), included players from the 2019–20 rosters of both Dynamo St. Petersburg and SK Gorny and was coached by Russian women's national team head coach Yevgeni Bobariko.

Schedule 
On 19 August 2020, the league released its schedule for the season, with the opening matches to be played on the 19 September. The schedule included a two-month gap without any games from December to February, time that could be used to accommodate rescheduling due to the pandemic and in which the league's All-Star Game and the 2021 Winter Universiade would be held (the Universiade was later rescheduled for December 2021 and ultimately cancelled). However, a day before the season was due to begin, the league postponed the start of the season to 3 October after encountering issues securing Russian visas for KRS Vanke Rays players – all but two of whom were international players – and in the hopes that SK Gorny may find sufficient sponsorships to participate. The delay also allowed teams to hold a short pre-season training camp.

Showcases 
On 22 December 2020, the Russian national ZhHL team (active ZhHL players who are also members of the Russian national team) competed in the second annual "Priceless Match", an outdoor showcase game which pits the team against a men's team of high-profile Russian retired athletes, business executives, and arts and entertainment personalities.

COVID-19 impact 
KRS Vanke Rays temporarily relocated from Shenzhen Dayun Arena in Shenzhen to the Ice Palace V.M. Bobrova in Stupino, Moscow Oblast for the 2020–21 season due to the increased immigration restrictions for entry into Russia that were implemented in response to the COVID-19 pandemic in Russia.

Players are tested for the virus once every five days, and before the start of every game.

Broadcasting   
The league streamed many games on its official YouTube channel, the same streaming option used in the previous season. In Russia, select games were also aired on the KHL TV channel.

Limited public attendance was permitted at games throughout much of the season.

Teams 

*Temporary relocation for 2020–21 season

Standings 
The regular season began on 3 October 2020 and concluded on 27 February 2021, with the four most successful teams securing playoff berths. 

The KRS Vanke Rays claimed their first regular season championship title after registering an exceptional 76 point season with a 26-2–0 win–loss record. The KRS Vanke Rays victory decisively ended the three-season reign of Agidel Ufa as regular season champs, with Agidel finishing sixteen points behind the Vanke Rays with a 20-7-1 record. SKIF Nizhny Novgorod improved from sixth place in the 2019–20 regular season to claim third place in 2020–21 and were the only team to pose a legitimate threat to Agidel’s position in second, ultimately tying Agidel with 60 points and winning more games overall but prevented from higher ranking by an excess of overtime wins in relation to relegation victories. Biryusa Krasnoyarsk claimed fourth place in a repeat of the previous season and trailing the other top ranked teams, with 47 points and a 15-9-4 record.

Player statistics

Scoring leaders 
The following skaters lead the league in points at the conclusion of the regular season on 27 February 2021.
{| class="wikitable sortable" style="text-align: center"
!
! style="width: 10em;" |Player
! style="width: 10em;" |Team
!
! style="width: 3em;" |
! style="width: 3em;" |
! style="width: 3em;" |
! style="width: 3em;" |
!+/−
! style="width: 3em;" |
|-
|1
| style="text-align:left;" |
| style="text-align:left;" |Vanke Rays
|C
|28
|29
|27
!56
|44
|6
|-
|2
| style="text-align:left;" |
| style="text-align:left;" |Tornado
|RW
|28
|26
|27
!53
|17
|30
|-
|3
| style="text-align:left;" | 
| style="text-align:left;" |Agidel
|LW
|27
|18
|32
!50
|33
|28
|-
|4
| style="text-align:left;" |
| style="text-align:left;" |Agidel
|F
|25
|15
|28
!43
|20
|14
|-
|5
| style="text-align:left;" |
| style="text-align:left;" |Biryusa
|F
|27
|16
|23
!39
|13
|8
|-
|6
| style="text-align:left;" | 
| style="text-align:left;" |Vanke Rays
|F
|28
|17
|20
!37
|24
|28
|-
|7
| style="text-align:left;" | 
| style="text-align:left;" |Vanke Rays
|D
|28
|13
|23
!36
|39
|20
|-
|8
| style="text-align:left;" | 
| style="text-align:left;" |Agidel
|D
|28
|9
|26
!35
|39
|42
|-
|9
| style="text-align:left;" | 
| style="text-align:left;" |Tornado
|D
|28
|14
|20
!34
|17
|26
|-
|10
| style="text-align:left;" |
| style="text-align:left;" |Vanke Rays
|F
|28
|14
|20
!33
|33
|20
|}
KRS Vanke Rays centre and captain Alex Carpenter claimed her second consecutive ZhHL scoring title, averaging two points per game across 28 games and ending the campaign with a total of 56 points (29 goals + 27 assists). Tornado winger and captain Anna Shokhina posted the second highest point total, tallying 53 points (26+27) in 28 games. Carpenter and Shokhina also ranked first and second league for goals, with 29 and 26 respectively. Agidel Ufa winger and alternate captain Olga Sosina topped the league in assists, notching 32 in 27 games and ranking third in scoring with 50 points (18+32).

Megan Bozek of the KRS Vanke Rays was the highest scoring defenceman, earning 36 points (13+23) and ranking eighth overall. Bozek was narrowly followed by defenders Anna Shibanova of Agidel Ufa, with 35 points (9+26), and Nina Pirogova of Tornado Dmitrov, with 34 points (14+20).

Four of the league’s eight teams were represented on the list of top ten point leaders for the season: the KRS Vanke Rays, with three forwards and one defenceman; the Agidel Ufa, with two forwards and one defenceman; the Tornado Dmitrov, with one forward and one defenceman; and the Biryusa Krasnoyarsk, represented by forward and captain Valeria Pavlova.

The following players were the top goal scorers of teams not represented in the top ten of the league, listed with their overall league rank:

 12. Fanuza Kadirova (F), Dinamo-Neva: 28 GP, 20 G, 11 A, 31 Pts, +13, 18 PIM
 39. Yekaterina Likhachyova (F), SKIF: 28 GP, 16 G, 9 A, 25 Pts, −3, 8 PIM
 54. Anastasia Nesterova (F), 7.62: 28 GP, 8 G, 2 A, 10 Pts, −23, 12 PIM
 58. Alina Narudinova (F), SKSO: 27 GP, 5 G, 3 A, 8 Pts, −31, 16 PIM

Top goaltenders 
The following goaltenders lead the league in save percentage at the conclusion of games played on 27 February 2021, while playing a minimum of 600 minutes.

Top backups 
The following goaltenders served as secondary or backup goaltenders, playing a minimum of 240 minutes but fewer than 600 minutes in the 2020–21 season. Players are ranked by save percentage at the conclusion of the regular season on 27 February 2021.

Playoffs

Bracket

Semifinals

(1) KRS Vanke Rays vs. (4) Biryusa 
All game times in Moscow Time (UTC+03:00)

(2) Agidel Ufa vs. (3) SKIF  
All game times in Moscow Time (UTC+03:00)

ZhHL Cup Final 
Originally scheduled to be begin on 13 March 2021, the ZhHL announced a postponement of the Zhenskaya Hockey League Cup finals following a positive COVID-19 test for an Agidel player. On 22 March, the league announced that the finals would be postponed until after the 2021 IIHF Women's World Championship Top Division tournament, which had been rescheduled to be held from 6–16 May in Nova Scotia, Canada. The delay became necessary as the required quarantine for Agidel would have created conflicts with the preparations of several national teams for the World Cup. At the time of announcement, dates for the rescheduled finals had not been determined.  

Ultimately, the 2021 World Championship in Nova Scotia was canceled and the tournament was relocated to Calgary and played during 20–31 August. As promised, the ZhHL Championship Finals were played following Worlds and began on 7 September. This created an unusual situation in which the KRS Vanke Rays participated in the playoff final with a roster of twelve or more players who had not played in the 2020–21 regular season or first round of the playoffs and lost several key players, including captain Alex Carpenter. In contrast, Agidel Ufa added only one player – 15 year old Maria Mikaelyan – and participated in the final with a nearly identical roster to the 2020–21 season. 

All game times in Moscow Time (UTC+03:00)

References

External links 
 Official website 

ZhHL season
2020–21 in Russian ice hockey leagues
Zhenskaya Hockey League